Diana Mary Mitchell (née Coates; 16 November 1932 – 8 January 2016) was a Zimbabwean political activist and writer, who was an outspoken critic of the governments of Ian Smith and Robert Mugabe.

Biography
Mitchell was born in Salisbury, the capital of Southern Rhodesia. Her father, Elliott Coates, was a merchant navy officer and her mother, Mary Peck, was an actress. Her parents' marriage ended in 1932, and she lived with foster parents during World War II while her mother worked in a munitions factory. She was educated at Eveline Girls High School in Bulawayo, and later at the University of Cape Town in South Africa, where she studied history and the Shona language. She married hydraulic engineer Brian Mitchell in 1956, and they had three children.

Mitchell's political activism began in 1966, when she campaigned to save a nursery school which was bulldozed by the government. The campaign later expanded to a broader one to improve education for black children. In 1968, she was involved with the Centre Party; although she ran as an independent candidate in the 1974 elections and for the National Unifying Force (NUF) in the 1977 elections.

After Smith's 1970 declaration of Rhodesia as a republic, Mitchell was involved with arranging negotiations between Smith's Rhodesian Front and militant nationalists. Working with journalists Robert Cary and Willie Musarurwa, she compiled and published a definitive biographical compilation of leaders in the nationalist movement,  African Nationalist Leaders in Rhodesia: Who's Who. Although delighted at Zimbabwe's eventual independence under terms acceptable to the international community in 1980, Mitchell was critical of the Mugabe government's suppression of the media and political opposition. She and her husband moved to Britain in 2003. Brian died in 2010.

In 2011, Mitchell's extensive collection of political clippings and papers were donated to the Hoover Institution, which opened them for public access, and to the University of Cape Town.

References

External links
Web version of Cary & Mitchell's African Nationalist Leaders in Rhodesia: Who's Who

1932 births
2016 deaths
Zimbabwean historians
Zimbabwean democracy activists
Academic staff of the University of Zimbabwe
University of Cape Town alumni
University of Zimbabwe alumni
Zimbabwean people of British descent
20th-century Zimbabwean women politicians
20th-century Zimbabwean politicians
Centre Party (Rhodesia) politicians
20th-century Zimbabwean writers
20th-century Zimbabwean women writers
21st-century Zimbabwean writers
21st-century Zimbabwean women writers
Women historians